Regy Thorpe (born November 27, 1971) is a former professional lacrosse player for the Rochester Knighthawks in the National Lacrosse League. He played his entire NLL career with the Knighthawks.  He also played with the Rochester Rattlers of Major League Lacrosse. Currently, Thorpe is the head coach for the Hamilton Nationals of Major League Lacrosse.

Career
Thorpe played for two years at Herkimer County Community College, where he earned All-America honors and was named the NJCAA Defenseman of the Year in 1991. He was inducted into the NJCAA Hall of Fame in 2011. He then enrolled at Syracuse University and helped the Orange to the national finals in 1992. In his senior season, Thorpe earned All-America honors after leading Syracuse to a national title as a team captain.

Thorpe has been a member of the Rochester Knighthawks since the team's inaugural season in 1995. He is the only member of the original team still with the Knighthawks. During the 2007 NLL season, Thorpe was named team captain, in the absence of injured Mike Hasen, and helped lead his team to the winning of the Champion's Cup.

In August 2008, Thorpe was named the new GM of the Knighthawks. It was announced at the time that he had retired from playing to take the GM job, but in November, Thorpe signed a playing contract, becoming the first player-GM in NLL history.

Thorpe gave up his front-office duties after the season, and it appeared his playing career was over as well, but in the first week of February 2010, he was re-signed to the Knighthawks roster to provide experience and physicality on the defense.

A product of the Syracuse Orange men's lacrosse program, Thorpe had also played with the Rochester Rattlers for the team's initial six seasons before retiring. He was initially acquired by the Rattlers in the 10th round of the 2001 MLL Supplemental Draft.

Internationally, Thorpe represented Team USA in the 2002 and 2004 Heritage Cup, and also won a bronze medal with Team USA in the 2007 World Indoor Lacrosse Championships.

Coaching
Thorpe was a player-coach for the Rochester Rattlers in 2006, before becoming a Head Coach for the Six Nations Arrows of the Ontario Junior A Lacrosse League before the 2007 summer season.

He also coaches the Jordan-Elbridge High School lacrosse team.

On February 3, 2011, Thorpe was named the head coach of the Hamilton Nationals of Major League Lacrosse.

Retirement
Thorpe officially retired as an active NLL player on December 4, 2010.

Statistics

NLL

MLL

References

1971 births
Living people
American lacrosse players
Lacrosse players from New York (state)
Major League Lacrosse coaches
Major League Lacrosse players
Rochester Knighthawks players
Sportspeople from Auburn, New York
Syracuse Orange men's lacrosse players